Justin Wellington sometimes also known by the initials JW (born January 11, 1978) is a Papua New Guinean singer presenting a blend of pop, reggae, R&B, dancehall and island music. He is most famous for his version of "Iko Iko" as "Iko Iko (My Bestie)" He has released three studio albums.

Career

Wellington was born to Australia-born parents who had immigrated to Papua New Guinea. He attended schools in Texas, USA and in Canada. He then began working as an R&B and reggae pop singer and has released several singles since 2002. Hits include "I Wanna Give You Some Lovin'", "Better Off", "One Night With You", "Much Love", "Fire", "In Love with U", "Runaway", "Tell Me", "Reminiscing", "Rain of Morobe" and others. He has worked with many Papua New Guinea artists such as AK-47, Tattz from NakaBlood, Jokema and O-Shen, Robbie T, Mekere Crew, Steven M, Gravity, DJ Travy etc.

His international breakthrough came with a cover of "Iko Iko", originally recorded by James "Sugar Boy" Crawford in 1953 and popularised by The Dixie Cups, Dr. John, Captain Jack amongst others. Justin Wellington's adapted version of the song as "Iko Iko (My Bestie)", which he actually released featuring Solomon Islands group Small Jam in 2017. It received worldwide attention as part of the social platform TikTok challenge. As a result, the cover was released by Sony Music UK on June 3, 2019, and started to gain international popularity in 2021. His version makes various changes to the lyrics of the verses, and has its own original sections, but keeps the chorus the same. It was later added alongside the TikTok dance into the video game Fortnite Battle Royale. He was nominated for "International Revelation of the Year" during the 2021 NRJ Music Awards.

Discography

Albums
2005: Much Love (Mangrove Productions)
2008: JW (Mangrove Productions)
2010: Reign of Morobe (Mangrove Productions)

Singles

Other songs
2005: "I Wanna Give You Some Lovin'"
2005: "Much Love"
2008: "Madina"
2009: "In Love With U"
2011: "Run Away"
2011: "Island Girl"
2011: "Fire"
2011: "Your Love" (feat. Sharzy)
2011: "Rain of Morobe" (feat. O-Shen)
2011: "Island Sound" (feat. K & Nela Music & D-Witty)
2012: "Christmas Is Finally Here" (feat. LiveBoys)
2013: "Need You" (feat. Pou Jackson)
2014: "Reminiscin" (feat. Gravity and Funky)
2015: "Long Way Back (To Your Heart)" (feat. Jokema)
2017: "Iko Iko (My Bestie)" (feat. Small Jam)
2017: "Island Moon" (feat. Jahboy)
2018: "My Girl" (feat. Leebonz & K-Dawg)
2020: "Sweet Mama" (feat. Papa Cidy)
2020: "She Don't Know" (feat. Dezine)
2020: "Show Me How"
2021: "Iko Iko (Ryan Freeston Remix)"

References

External links
Facebook
YouTube

1978 births
Living people
Papua New Guinean musicians
Papua New Guinean people of Australian descent